Carroll Creek may refer to:

Carroll Creek (Maryland), a tributary of the Monocacy River
Carroll Creek (Clear Creek), a stream in Missouri
Carroll Creek (South Dakota), a stream